Eupithecia collineata is a moth in the  family Geometridae. It is found in Argentina.

References

Moths described in 1906
collineata
Moths of South America